Mercedes-Benz Arena may refer to:

Mercedes-Benz Arena (Berlin), Germany
Mercedes-Benz Arena (Stuttgart), Germany
Mercedes-Benz Arena (Shanghai), China

See also
Mercedes-Benz Stadium, Atlanta, Georgia, United States
Caesars Superdome, formerly known as Mercedes-Benz Superdome, New Orleans, Louisiana, United States